Gary Ward may refer to:

 Gary Ward (baseball coach) (born 1940), college baseball coach
 Gary Ward (outfielder) (born 1953), Major League Baseball outfielder and right-handed batter
 Gary Ward (footballer), for Melbourne Knights FC

See also
 Gareth Ward, Australian politician
 Garry Ward, rugby league footballer of the 1980s